This is a list of players who have played first-class cricket for the Southern Rocks, a Zimbabwean cricket team. Southern Rocks have played 25 first-class matches, but are yet to win a game. Thirty players have played for the team at first-class level.

List of players
Key
 played international cricket
* captained the team in at least one match
† played as wicket-keeper for at least one match

Notes

Captains

References

 
Southern Rocks first-class